Global Crime is a quarterly peer-reviewed academic journal covering the study of crime. It was established in 1995 as Transnational Organized Crime, obtaining its current name in 2004. It is published by Routledge and the editor-in-chief is Carlo Morselli (University of Montreal).

Abstracting and indexing
The journal is abstracted and indexed in:

References

External links

Routledge academic journals
Criminology journals
Publications established in 1995
English-language journals
Quarterly journals